Beaches was a federal electoral district in Toronto, Ontario, Canada, represented in the House of Commons of Canada from 1979 to 1988.

The riding was created in 1976, from parts of Broadview, Greenwood and York East ridings.

Boundaries
It was created in 1976 with the following boundaries - from Leslie Street where it meets Lake Ontario, the boundary proceeded north along Leslie to Queen Street East. It went west along Queen to Jones Avenue then north along Jones to Gerrard Street East, east along Gerrard and then north on Greenwood Avenue to the city limits. It followed the city limits east to Victoria Park Avenue and then south following Victoria Park back to the lake.

The electoral district was abolished in 1987 when it was redistributed between Beaches—Woodbine and Broadview—Greenwood ridings.

Members of Parliament

Election results

References

Former federal electoral districts of Ontario
Federal electoral districts of Toronto